Megachile nelsoni is a species of bee in the family Megachilidae. It was described by Mitchell in 1936.

References

Nelsoni
Insects described in 1936